Modal may refer to:
 Modal (textile), a textile made from spun cellulose fiber
 Modal analysis, the study of the dynamic properties of structures under vibrational excitation
 Modal bandwidth, in the discipline of telecommunications, refers to the signalling rate per distance unit
 Modal haplotype, an ancestral haplotype derived from the DNA test results of a specific group of people
 Modal jazz, jazz that uses musical modes rather than chord progressions as a harmonic framework
 Modal logic, a type of formal logic that extends the standards of formal logic to include the elements of modality
 Modal matrix, used in the diagonalization process involving eigenvalues and eigenvectors
 Modal phenomena
 Modal administration, used in Federal Agencies to describe sub-offices or "modes"
 Modal transportation, used in transit to describe multiple modes of transit available such as bus, trolley, train, ferry
 Modal score, used in testing and education for the most common score
 Modal verb, a type of auxiliary verb that is used to indicate modality
 Modal window, a child window that requires users to interact with it before they can return to operating the parent application
 A trade name for sulpiride, an atypical antipsychotic drug
 Modal Commerce, an American-based company that sells online software to car dealerships

See also
 Mode (disambiguation)
 Modality (disambiguation)